Nobody's Kid is a 1921 American silent comedy drama film directed by Howard Hickman and starring Mae Marsh, Kathleen Kirkham and Anne Schaefer. It was based on the 1910 novel Mary Cary "Frequently Martha" by Kate Langley Bosher.

Cast
 Mae Marsh as Mary Cary
 Kathleen Kirkham as Katherine Trent
 Anne Schaefer as 	Miss Bray
 Maxine Elliott Hicks as Pinky Moore
 John Steppling as Dr. Rudd
 Paul Willis as John Maxwell

References

Bibliography
 Goble, Alan. The Complete Index to Literary Sources in Film. Walter de Gruyter, 1999.

External links
 

1920s American films
1921 films
1921 drama films
1920s English-language films
American silent feature films
Silent American drama films
American black-and-white films
Films directed by Howard Hickman
Film Booking Offices of America films